Te Puka is one of 43 islands in the Manihiki atoll of the Cook Islands. It is a small islet in the south-west corner of the atoll, just inside the reef from Tauhunu.

References

Manihiki